His Majesty O'Keefe is a 1954 American adventure film directed by Byron Haskin and starring Burt Lancaster. The cast also included Joan Rice, André Morell, Abraham Sofaer, Archie Savage, and Benson Fong. The screenplay by Borden Chase and James Hill was based on the novel of the same name by Laurence Klingman and Gerald Green (1952).

Plot 
Captain David O'Keefe, seeking his fortune in the 19th century South Pacific, decides to enlist island natives to harvest copra, but runs into a wall of cultural problems. Backed by a Chinese dentist, he obtains a ship and sets about harvesting copra while fending off cantankerous native chieftains and ambitious German empire-builders. The natives, happy with their existence, see no reason to work hard to obtain copra, either for a German trading company or for O'Keefe. He finally motivates them by showing them how to produce large quantities of Rai stones, the stone money of Yap, their valued coinage.

Cast

Historical basis 

The story is based on the life of a sailor named David O'Keefe who in 1871 was shipwrecked on Yap in the Caroline Islands, where he found the natives highly prized Rai stones quarried at great effort and danger on the island of Palau. He organized the natives to produce the large stone disks by employing modern methods and then used them to buy copra for coconut oil. The stones he produced were not valued as highly as those obtained by traditional methods due to the lack of personal sacrifice in their production, and the effect of an inflationary over-production.

Production

Original book 
O'Keefe's life was turned into a 1950 book by Lawrence Klingman and Gerard Green.  The Los Angeles Times said the writers did "a magnificent job". The Chicago Tribune called it a "well told story". The New York Times called it "interesting" and "curious".

Development 
Film rights were optioned in December 1950 by Norma Productions, the company of Harold Hecht and Burt Lancaster.

In April 1951 Lancaster announced Fred Zinnemann would direct. Lancaster was very busy at this time in his career and the film was not made immediately. In January 1952 Frank Nugent was reported as working on the script. In May 1952 Byron Haskin signed to direct.

The film would be the last in a six-picture deal between Hecht, Lancaster and Warner Bros.  The others had been Kiss the Blood Off My Hands, The First Time, Ten Tall Men, The Flame and the Arrow, and The Crimson Pirate.

Preproduction 
Haskin arrived in Sydney, Australia in June 1952 and five Australian actors had roles in the supporting cast, including Lloyd Berrell, Guy Doleman, Muriel Steinbeck, Grant Taylor and Harvey Adams.

Max Osbiston was offered a role but turned it down due to his film commitments.

Later in June Haskin moved to Fiji where the bulk of the movie was shot.

The film was made with "frozen" English funds, so many English technicians and cast were used and it was decided to shoot on location in Fiji, a British colony at the time.

Joan Rice was cast in July 1952.

Shooting 
Fiming took four months, mostly on location in the South Pacific in Fiji – not Yap. Also, indigenous people and customs/dances portrayed in the movie were Fijian.

The choreographer was Daniel Nagrin.

The unit was based at the Beachcomber Hotel at Deuba Beach in Viti Levu. The entire village of Goloa five miles west of the hotel was rented. Two miles east of Deuba the unit built a temporary sound stage as well as a darkroom and lab. The village was handed over to the locals after the unit left

"I can't say that we'd ever want to remake O'Keefe," said Lancaster later. "It was so tough working in the humidity that one day I actually watched fungus grow on my clothes. Every day blazing sun or tropical rain beat down upon us and at night there were always mosquitos."

Haskin spoke highly of Australian actors saying:
American   actors   are   hothouse  plants   by   comparison because   they   don't   have   such   an   exacting   apprenticeship   as   Australian   radio and   repertory   give. Few   of   the   unknowns   we   try   out   can   pick   up   any  script   and   do   any   kind   of   part   with  out   rehearsal. But   your   boys   can. And   they   don't   mess   about.
Filming finished in November 1952.

Reception 
The film was popular. According to Kinematograph Weekly the film was a "money maker" at the British box office in 1954.

However Warner Bros were unhappy by the fact it went over budget. Hecht and Lancaster brought in screenwriter James Hill to form Hecht-Hill-Lancaster and they signed with United Artists.

Legacy 
The film prompted Guy Doleman to go to Hollywood.

Director Byron Haskin later returned to Australia to make Long John Silver (1954).

References 

Chujoy, Anatole. The Dance Encyclopedia. (Simon and Schuster, 1967)

External links 
 
 
 
 Review of film at New York Times
 Review of film at Variety

1950s historical adventure films
1954 films
American historical adventure films
Films based on American novels
Films directed by Byron Haskin
Films produced by Burt Lancaster
Films produced by Harold Hecht
Films scored by Dimitri Tiomkin
Films set in the 19th century
Films set in the Federated States of Micronesia
Films shot in Fiji
Norma Productions films
Pirate films
Seafaring films
Warner Bros. films
1950s English-language films
1950s American films